Holy Cross Academy was a Catholic school in Kendale Lakes census-designated place, unincorporated Miami-Dade County, Florida. It was in the West Kendall area, near Kendall.

It was owned and operated independently of the Roman Catholic Archdiocese of Miami. It incorporated a monastery.

It had a  campus and served grades kindergarten through 12.

History
Reverend Abbott Gregory Wendt established the school in 1985. It started as a Greek (Byzantine) Catholic institution. Its accreditation records circa 2004 described it as an independent Catholic institution.

Prior to 2001 the average enrollment was about 500. On March 25, 2001, Ukrainian Mykhaylo Kofel murdered nun-in-training Michelle Lewis; authorities discovered her body in the convent house on campus. Kofel pleaded guilty in 2005 and was scheduled to have a thirty-year sentence. Prosecutors initially sought the death penalty but no longer pursued it after Kofel made allegations of sexual abuse. The scandal caused multiple parents to send children to other schools, and the average post-murder enrollment was 340. Circa 2004 there were 37 people in the school's faculty. The school closed in 2004, and the charter school Archimedean Academy acquired the campus.

Operations
Circa 2004 the yearly tuition was $6,525.

Academic performance
Luisa Yanez of the Miami Herald wrote that Holy Cross "enjoyed a stellar academic reputation."

References

Further reading
 

Schools in Miami-Dade County, Florida
Catholic secondary schools in Florida
1985 establishments in Florida
Educational institutions established in 1985
2004 disestablishments in Florida
Educational institutions disestablished in 2004
Private K-12 schools in Florida
Eastern Catholicism in the United States
Christian monasteries in the United States
Byzantine Catholic Metropolia of Pittsburgh